Mansfelder Grund-Helbra is a Verbandsgemeinde ("collective municipality") in the Mansfeld-Südharz district, in Saxony-Anhalt, Germany. Before 1 January 2010, it was a Verwaltungsgemeinschaft. It is situated between Eisleben and Mansfeld. The seat of the Verbandsgemeinde is in Helbra.

The Verbandsgemeinde Mansfelder Grund-Helbra consists of the following municipalities:

 Ahlsdorf 
 Benndorf 
 Blankenheim 
 Bornstedt 
 Helbra
 Hergisdorf 
 Klostermansfeld 
 Wimmelburg

References

Verbandsgemeinden in Saxony-Anhalt